Manuel Hernán Baeza Cornejo (born 9 October 1956) is a Chilean former footballer who played as a forward for clubs in Chile and El Salvador.

Career
Born in Santiago, Chile, as a youth player, Baeza was with club Los Cóndores from Lo Prado and Magallanes. As a professional player, he played for clubs such as Magallanes, Santiago Morning, Regional Atacama, Unión San Felipe, O'Higgins, among others.

As a player in the Segunda División, he got promotion to the top division with both Santiago Morning by becoming the runner-up in the 1982 season, and O'Higgins by winning the promotion playoffs in the 1987 season. He also became the top goalscorer in the 1987 season playing for Deportes Antofagasta, with 18 goals.

He moved to El Salvador in 1989, where he played for Acajutla.

His last club was Deportes Arica in 1991.

Personal life
He was nicknamed Camión (Truck), due to his physical build.

Following his retirement, he continued playing football at amateur level in clubs such as Unión Lo Franco.

Honours
 Segunda División de Chile Top Goalscorer: 1985

References

External links
 Manuel Baeza at PlaymakerStats.com
 Manuel Baeza at MemoriaWanderers.cl 

1956 births
Living people
Footballers from Santiago
Chilean footballers
Chilean expatriate footballers
Deportes Magallanes footballers
C.D. Huachipato footballers
Santiago Morning footballers
Regional Atacama footballers
Unión San Felipe footballers
C.D. Antofagasta footballers
Provincial Osorno footballers
O'Higgins F.C. footballers
Santiago Wanderers footballers
Deportes Linares footballers
Magallanes footballers
San Marcos de Arica footballers
Primera B de Chile players
Chilean Primera División players
Salvadoran Primera División players
Chilean expatriate sportspeople in El Salvador
Expatriate footballers in El Salvador
Association football forwards